Md. Nuruzzaman is a justice on the Appellate Division of Bangladesh Supreme Court.

Early life 
Nuruzzaman was born on 1 July 1956.

Career 
Nuruzzaman was in the Mukti Bahini and fought in the Bangladesh Liberation war in 1971.

Nuruzzaman started working as a lawyer on 4 September 1983.

In 1987, Nuruzzaman became an advocate in the Bangladesh High Court.

On 30 June 2009, Nuruzzaman was appointed an Additional Judge of the High Court Division. He became a full judge of the High Court on 6 June 2011.

On 17 September 2016, a bench led by Nuruzzaman and Justice Zafar Ahmed rejected a petition by Prime Minister Khaleda Zia challenging the proceedings of Barapukuria coal scam case.

Nuruzzaman was appointed to the Bangladesh Judicial Service Commission on 6 December 2017.

On 9 October 2018, Nuruzzaman was appointed to the Appellate Division of the Supreme Court of Bangladesh. He is the chairperson of the enrollment committee of the Bangladesh Bar Council. In January 2019, he became the chamber judge of the Appellate Division. On 19 December 2019, he was appointed the vacation judge by the chief justice.

References 

Living people
20th-century Bangladeshi lawyers
Supreme Court of Bangladesh justices
21st-century Bangladeshi judges
Year of birth missing (living people)